The 1931 International Society for Contemporary Music Festival was the ninth edition of the society's annual festival. It was held in London and Oxford from 23 to 28 July 1931 and consisted of six concerts featuring 29 compositions from thirteen countries, including one opera. Eleven works were broadcast by the BBC, bringing the festival to national attention.

Aaron Copland was critical of the event, criticizing that the ISCM Festival had become a means "to consecrate the glory of established reputations and to call to the attention of an international public the music of certain newer composers" rather than supporting the most revolutionary musical tendencies.

Programme

References

ISMC 1931
International Society for Contemporary Music Festival
1931 music festivals